The North-West Mounted Police (NWMP) played a significant role during the North-West Rebellion in Canada in 1885. The NWMP suffered early reverses and, although they supported the relief force sent to the region under the command of Major-General Frederick Middleton, their performance was heavily criticized. Commissioner Acheson Irvine resigned from his command of the police as a result.

Beginning of the rebellion
Rebellion broke along in the North Saskatchewan River valley in March 1885. The rebellion by the Métis, led by Louis Riel, was driven by both political and economic issues; Riel intended to form a provisional government, hopefully supported by the Cree; defeat the NWMP and seize the region; and then force the Canadian government to negotiate. Concerns had existed among the NWMP since the previous fall and the force had increased its presence in the area over the winter. As tensions rose, Commissioner Acheson Irvine responded to messages from units in the area and began to mobilise any spare manpower in Regina. Conflict began when Riel's men took Batoche on 18 March, cutting telegraph lines and taking hostages.

Initial police response

Irvine marched at speed through the snow to Prince Albert, which he garrisoned with 90 police. Then set off for Fort Carlton. Superintendent Leif Crozier organized defences in Battleford, then marched with 50 police and a 7-pounder to Fort Carlton. Riel demanded his surrender, which Crozier refused. The two sides clashed over attempts to seize a cache of supplies in the area, when Crozier with 55 NWMP and 43 civilian volunteers confronted a larger force of rebels at Duck Lake on 26 March; the government forces came off much worse in the resulting fight. In the aftermath, some of the Cree leaders, in particular Poundmaker and Big Bear, joined the Métis in their revolt, although others continued to tacitly support the government.

Retreat

The NWMP numbered 562 at the start of the conflict and rapidly abandoned most of the posts along the valley. Fort Carlton appeared indefensible and the police abandoned it on 27 March, arriving at Prince Albert the following day, where 225 police, supported by police, oversaw chaotic scenes among the refugees. Rather than withdrawing his police unit and the settlers from Prince Albert, however, Irvine instead used the town as a centre for those fleeing the fighting in the region, but the town was effectively cut off by the rebellion. 

On 29 March, the rebel Cree approached Battleford, protected by 43 NWMP under the command of Inspector William Morris. The town was looted and the Cree placed the police fort under siege for a period. At Fort Saskatchewan, near Edmonton, Inspector Arthur Griesbach set about improving the defences with his garrison of 20 NWMP, and encouraged the town of Edmonton to do similarly.

Inspector Francis Dickens was commanding Fort Pitt with 25 men and limited ammunition; he swore in the civilians as special constables but believed the fort to indefensible and made preparations to leave by boat. On 13 April, Big Bear with 250 Cree arrived and demanded their surrender; after negotiations and a confrontation the civilians surrendered and Dickens and his men fled the fort using a makeshift boat. They were taken in by the garrison at Battleford on 22 April.

Recovery

Militia units numbering more than 5,000 strong hurried west along the Canadian Pacific Railway, commanded by Major-General Frederick Middleton. Middleton's plan depended on three groups striking into the rebel territories, with Middleton leading the main force to retake Batoche. The second and third columns, commanded by Lieutenant Colonel W. Otter and Major-General Thomas Strange, were accompanied by 74 and 20 NWMP men respectively, the latter group armed with a 9-pounder field gun. 

Otter's men reached Battleford on 1 May 1885 and marched south to Cut Knife Creek where they expected to find Poundmaker, with the NWMP forming the advance guard. Otter surprised the camp at dawn but the attack by the advance troops rapidly slowed and, despite the Cree's limited weapons, the government forces were defeated and forced to retreat to Battleford. 

After many delays, Middleton finally attacked Batoche and captured Riel, and then formally relieved Prince Albert on 20 May. Strange advanced to Edmonton, with Sam Steele of the NWMP commanding his scouts, and pursued Big Bear and the remnants of the rebellious Cree until they were captured. Riel was imprisoned by the NWMP at Regina, given a short trial and then hanged.

Aftermath

Middleton criticised Irvine and the NWMP for having remained in Prince Albert throughout the campaign, and for failing to reinforce him during the Battle of Batoche. The Major-General likened the NWMP to "gophers", who retreated and hid during fighting, and the complaints were picked up by the press. Crozier was criticised by Irvine for "the impetuosity displayed by both the police and volunteers" at Duck Lake and, when the details became public, he resigned. Irvine defended his defensive stance around Prince Albert, but was criticised by the press for his lack of "vigour". Lacking the support of the Prime Minister, he resigned the next year.

Early historians defended the performance of the mounted police, noting that the force was mostly under the command of the militia and General Middleton himself, and were not given opportunities to show their value in battle. Later historians have been more critical, R. C. Macleod, for example, noting that Irvine's failure to reinforce Middleton "can only be explained by excessive caution...or by his ignorance of what was happening on his doorstep". Stanley Horrall blames the poor performance by the police on a combination of the government's neglect of the mounted police and the weak leadership shown by Commissioner Irvine in the years running up to the rebellion. Nonetheless, historians consider that the NWMP's good relationships with the local First Nation groups valuable during the campaign.

References

Bibliography
 
 
 
 
North-West_Rebellion
North-West Rebellion
Canadian Militia units of The North-West Rebellion